Ultimate is a greatest hits compilation album by UK electronic music band Pet Shop Boys. It is their third greatest hits album, released on 1 November 2010 by their long-time label Parlophone. The album contains 18 previously released singles, in chronological order, and one new song ("Together"). Ultimate was released to celebrate 25 years since the band's first single release "West End Girls" in standard single-CD and expanded CD/DVD configurations. It charted at number 27 on the UK Albums Chart on 7 November 2010, with first-week sales of 8,886 copies. On the European Top 100 Albums it reached number 50 on 20 November 2010.

The single "Together", containing two cover tracks and an extended version of the song was released on 24 October 2010 digitally and on 29 November physically.

Track listing

CD and digital download
all songs written by Neil Tennant and Chris Lowe except where noted.
 "West End Girls" [2001 Remaster] - 4:04
 "Suburbia" [2010 Remaster] - 4:00
 "It's a Sin" [2001 Remaster] - 5:00
 "What Have I Done to Deserve This?" [2001 Remaster] (with Dusty Springfield) (Tennant, Lowe, Allee Willis) - 4:19
 "Always on My Mind" [2003 Remaster] (Johnny Christopher, Mark James, Wayne Carson) - 3:56
 "Heart" [2010 Remaster] - 4:17
 "Domino Dancing" [2003 Remaster] - 4:17
 "Left to My Own Devices" [2001 Remaster] - 4:45
 "Being Boring" [2001 Remaster] - 4:50
 "Where the Streets Have No Name (I Can't Take My Eyes off You)" [2003 Remaster] (Adam Clayton, Bono, Larry Mullen Jr., The Edge, Bob Crewe, Bob Gaudio) - 4:31
 "Go West" [Radio Edit] (Jacques Morali, Henri Belolo, Victor Willis, Tennant, Lowe) - 5:01
 "Before" [2001 Remaster] - 4:04
 "Se a vida é (That's the Way Life Is)" [2001 Remaster] - 4:00
 "New York City Boy" (US Radio Edit) [2003 Remaster] - 3:19
 "Home and Dry" [2003 Remaster] - 3:57
 "Miracles" (Radio Edit) (Tennant, Lowe, Adam F, Dan Stein) - 3:55
 "I'm with Stupid" - 3:26
 "Love etc." (Tennant, Lowe, Brian Higgins, Miranda Cooper, Parker, Tim Powell) - 3:30
 "Together" (Ultimate mix) (Tennant, Lowe, Powell) - 3:29

DVD
 "West End Girls" (Top of the Pops, 05/12/85)
 "Love Comes Quickly" (Top of the Pops, 20/03/86) (Tennant, Lowe, Stephen Hague)
 "Opportunities (Let's Make Lots of Money)" (BBC 2's Whistle Test, 29/04/86)
 "Suburbia" (Top of the Pops, 02/10/86)
 "It's a Sin" (Top of the Pops, 25/06/87)
 "Rent" (Top of the Pops, 22/10/87)
 "Always on My Mind" (Top of the Pops, 10/12/87) (Johnny Christopher, Mark James, Wayne Carson Thompson)
 "What Have I Done to Deserve This?" (Brit Awards, 08/02/88) (Tennant, Lowe, Allee Willis)
 "Heart" (BBC 1's Wogan, 30/03/88)
 "Domino Dancing" (Top of the Pops, 22/09/88)
 "Left to My Own Devices" (Top of the Pops, 01/12/88)
 "So Hard" (BBC 1's Wogan, 28/09/90)
 "Being Boring" (Top of the Pops, 29/11/90)
 "Can You Forgive Her?" (Top of the Pops, 10/06/93)
 "Liberation" (Top of the Pops, 07/04/94)
 "Paninaro '95" (Top of the Pops, 03/08/95)
 "Se a Vida é (That's the Way Life Is)" (Top of the Pops, 02/12/03)
 "A Red Letter Day" (Top of the Pops, 28/03/97)
 "Somewhere" (Top of the Pops, 04/07/97) (Leonard Bernstein, Stephen Sondheim)
 "I Don't Know What You Want But I Can't Give It Any More" (Top of the Pops, 30/07/99)
 "New York City Boy" (Top of the Pops, 08/10/99)
 "You Only Tell Me You Love Me When You're Drunk" (Top of the Pops, 14/01/00)
 "Home and Dry" (Top of the Pops, 29/03/02)
 "I Get Along" (Top of the Pops 2, 17/04/02)
 "Miracles" (Top of the Pops, 14/11/03)
 "Flamboyant" (Top of the Pops, 19/03/04)
 "I'm with Stupid" (Top of the Pops, 23/04/06)
 Live at Glastonbury 2010 (BBC Three 26/06/10)

Charts

References

Pet Shop Boys video albums
Pet Shop Boys compilation albums
2010 greatest hits albums
Parlophone compilation albums
Parlophone video albums
Electropop video albums